The Saint Francis of Assisi Complex in Louisville, Kentucky is a historic church at 1960 Bardstown Road.  It was built in 1926-28 and added to the National Register of Historic Places in 1987.

It includes the St. Francis of Assisi School and a rectory, both designed by Fred T. Erhart (1870-1951).

The school was deemed "an outstanding example of the Spanish Mission style and one of very few of this type constructed in the Louisville area."

References

Churches on the National Register of Historic Places in Kentucky
Roman Catholic churches completed in 1928
20th-century Roman Catholic church buildings in the United States
Roman Catholic churches in Louisville, Kentucky
National Register of Historic Places in Louisville, Kentucky
Mission Revival architecture in Kentucky
1928 establishments in Kentucky
Spanish Colonial Revival architecture in the United States